R Virginis is a Mira variable in the constellation Virgo. Located approximately  distant, it varies between magnitudes 6.1 and 12.1 over a period of approximately 146 days. Its variable nature was discovered by Karl Ludwig Harding in 1809.

References

Mira variables
Virgo (constellation)
M-type giants
Virginis, R
4808
109914
061667
Durchmusterung objects
Emission-line stars